Sultan Rahi (June 24, 1938 – January 9, 1996) was a Pakistani actor, producer and screenwriter. 

He established himself as one of the leading and most successful actors of Pakistani and Punjabi cinema, and received a reputation as Pakistan's "Clint Eastwood". 

During a career spanning 40 years, he acted in some 703 Punjabi films and 100 Urdu films, winning around 160 awards.

Rahi earned two Nigar Awards for his work in Babul (1971) and Basheera (1972). 

In 1975 he portrayed the character of Maula Jatt in Wehshi Jatt, winning his third Nigar Award. He reprised the role in its sequel Maula Jatt. 

Some of his other films include Sher Khan, Chan Veryam, Kaley Chore, The Godfather, Sharif Badmash and Wehshi Gujjar.

Life and career
Rahi was born in Rawalpindi, British India, in 1938 to an Arain family during the British Raj.

His father, Subedar Major Abdul Majeed, was a retired officer from the British Indian Army.

He began his film career in 1959 as a guest actor in the film Baghi. His first breakthrough came with the film Wehshi Jatt (1975). This was the unofficial prequel to Maula Jatt (1979). Maula Jatt was released on 11 February 1979, which became his most successful Pakistani film. His other works include Behram Daku (1980), Sher Khan (1981),  Sala Sahib and Ghulami (1985).

Sultan Rahi appeared in key roles in over 535 films.

Family
He had five children, of which one, Haider Sultan, is also an actor.

Death
On 9 January 1996, Rahi and his friend Ahsan, a film director, were travelling from Islamabad to Lahore on the main highway in Pakistan, Grand Trunk Road. Their vehicle got a flat tyre near Aimanabad Chungi, not far from Gujranwala. 

While they were installing a spare tyre, thieves approached the vehicle and tried to rob them. Rahi and his friend were both shot; Rahi eventually succumbed to his wounds, dying as a result.

Legacy
Rahi worked in the Punjabi film industry for over four decades. 

He was the highest paid Pakistani actor of his time. 

He was named in the Guinness Book of World Records as the most prolific actor. 

Director Altaf Hussain told media about his death and added that "I think such actors are only born once. He was a trendsetter – his films were copied in other countries but no one was able to perform like him." 

Bahar Begum reacted by saying: "I remember Sultan always saying that this industry will miss him when he’s gone but at the time, I don’t think we fully understood what he meant, but he truly proved his worth, There was only one Sutlan Rahi in Lollywood and there will always be one Sultan Rahi – no one can replace him".

Mustafa Qureshi commented that "Our onscreen chemistry was unique in a number of ways. Our pairing was the most popular film partnership throughout Lollywood's history, It’s true, there will never be another Sultan Rahi, ever. Everything he earned was a result of sheer hard work and talent". 

Film director Pervaiz Rana added: "Even though we are still making Punjabi films and many new heroes have entered and left the industry, I don’t think the golden era of Sultan Rahi will ever come back. His dialogues are etched in our hearts and memories, It’s the country’s love for Sultan that continues to reflect in his pictures and posters being plastered in shops and on buses."

Awards and honours
Nigar Awards

Won
 Nigar Awards 1971 - Special Award for Babul 
 Nigar Awards 1972 - Best Actor for Basheera
 Nigar Awards 1975 - Best Actor for Wehshi Jatt

Filmography

Bibliography
Zāhid ʻAkāsī, Sult̤ān Rāhī : Pākistānī filmon̲ kā sult̤ān, Lahore : Jumhuri Publications, 2019 (reprint of the 2010 edition), 169 p. Biography.

See also
List of Pakistani Punjabi-language films
List of Lollywood actors

References

External links
 
Filmography of Sultan Rahi on Complete Index To World Film (CITWF) website

1938 births
1996 deaths
20th-century Pakistani male actors
Male actors from Rawalpindi
Nigar Award winners
Pakistani male film actors
Pakistani film producers
Pakistani screenwriters
Pakistani stunt performers
Male actors in Punjabi cinema
Punjabi people
Male actors in Urdu cinema
Deaths by firearm in Pakistan
Assassinated Pakistani people
20th-century screenwriters